Germaine Mason (20 January 1983 – 20 April 2017) was a Jamaican-born track and field  athlete competing in high jump.  In 2006, he switched sporting allegiance, and then represented Great Britain. As a Great Britain competitor, he won the Silver Medal at the 2008 Summer Olympics.

Career
Mason won silver and bronze medals at the World Junior Championships in 2000 and 2002 respectively, the latter event held in his hometown of Kingston. His first medal at senior level came at the 2003 Pan American Games in Santo Domingo, when he won a gold medal, having achieved a personal best jump of 2.34 metres. He finished fifth at the World Championships the same year.

The following seasons saw him drop to 2.25 m (2004) and 2.27 m (2005), but 2.25 m was enough to win a bronze medal at the 2004 IAAF World Indoor Championships. The medal was won jointly with Jaroslav Bába and Ştefan Vasilache.

Mason was eligible to represent Great Britain because his father David was born in London. Mason's mother persuaded him to switch allegiance, and Mason's change in nationality was ratified by athletics' governing body, the IAAF, in 2006.

Mason won a silver medal for Great Britain at the Beijing Olympics on 19 August 2008. He equalled his personal best of 2.34 m, beaten only by Russia's Andrey Silnov with 2.36 m. It was Great Britain's first track and field medal of the games.

Mason died in a motorbike accident on 20 April 2017 at the age of 34. Upon returning from a soca party he was riding his motorbike when he crashed.

Achievements

References

External links
 Obituary in The Independent by Marcus Williamson
 
 Official website 
 Management website

1983 births
2017 deaths
Sportspeople from Kingston, Jamaica
Jamaican male high jumpers
British male high jumpers
Olympic male high jumpers
Olympic athletes of Great Britain
Olympic silver medallists for Great Britain
Olympic silver medalists in athletics (track and field)
Athletes (track and field) at the 2008 Summer Olympics
Medalists at the 2008 Summer Olympics
Commonwealth Games competitors for Jamaica
Athletes (track and field) at the 2002 Commonwealth Games
Pan American Games gold medalists for Jamaica
Pan American Games gold medalists in athletics (track and field)
Athletes (track and field) at the 2003 Pan American Games
World Athletics Championships athletes for Great Britain
World Athletics Championships athletes for Jamaica
British Athletics Championships winners
Jamaican emigrants to the United Kingdom
Road incident deaths in Jamaica
Motorcycle road incident deaths
Medalists at the 2003 Pan American Games